Sadykhov, Sadikhov, Sadigov or Sadiqov (Azerbaijani: Sadıqov or Sadıxov, Russian: Садыхов) is an Azerbaijani or post-Soviet (Bashkortostan, Kazakhstan, Kyrgyzstan, Chuvashia, Dagestan, Tatarstan, Uzbekistan etc.) masculine surname; its feminine counterpart is Sadykhova, Sadikhova, Sadigova or Sadiqova. It is slavicized from the Arabic masculine name Sadiq. It may refer to:

Sadigov
Aminaga Sadigov (born 1962), Azerbaijani scientist
Huseynagha Sadigov (born 1940), Azerbaijani politician
Najmaddin Sadigov (born 1956), Chief of General Staff of Azerbaijani Armed Forces
Nuraddin Sadigov (1935–2009), Chief of General Staff of Azerbaijani Armed Forces

Sadikhov
Oleg Sadikhov (born 1966), Israeli weightlifter

Sadykhov
Chingiz Sadykhov (1929–2017), Azerbaijani pianist 
Ragim Sadykhov (born 1996), Russian football player
Yusif Sadykhov (1918–1971), Azerbaijani Red Army soldier

Sadykov
Aizat Sadykov (born 1993), Russian football player
Sagdat Sadykov (born 1973), Kazakhstani judoka

Sadikova
Salamat Sadikova (born 1956), Kyrgyz folk singer
Sara Sadíqova (1906–1986), Tatar actress, singer and composer

See also
Sadykovo, a suburban village in the Kalininsky District, Tver Oblast.

Azerbaijani-language surnames
Patronymic surnames
Surnames from given names